The Alliance Premier League season of 1983–84 was the fifth season of the Alliance Premier League.

New teams in the league this season
 Gateshead (promoted 1982–83)
 Kidderminster Harriers (promoted 1982–83)

Final table

Results

Top scorers

Promotion and relegation

Promoted

 Barrow (from the Northern Premier League)
 Dartford (from the Southern Premier League)

Relegated
 Bangor City (to the Northern Premier League)
 Trowbridge Town (to the Southern Premier League)

Election to the Football League

As winners of the Alliance Premier League, Maidstone United won the right (for the 2nd time) to apply for election to the Football League to replace one of the four bottom sides in the 1983–84 Football League Fourth Division. The vote went as follows:

As a result of this, Maidstone United did not gain membership of the Football League.

References

External links
 1983–84 Conference National Results
 Re-election Results – The Division Four final league table, including the results of the re-election vote.

National League (English football) seasons
5